New Baltimore is the name of several communities in the United States:

New Baltimore, Indiana, an unincorporated community
New Baltimore, Michigan, a city
New Baltimore, New York, a town
New Baltimore (CDP), New York, hamlet in the town
New Baltimore, Ohio, a census-designated place in Hamilton County
New Baltimore, Stark County, Ohio, an unincorporated community
New Baltimore, Pennsylvania, a borough
New Baltimore, Virginia, an unincorporated community